The Bergen rune charm is a runic inscription on a piece of wood found among the medieval rune-staves of Bergen. It is noted for its similarities to the Eddaic poem Skírnismál (particularly stanza 36); as a rare example of a poetic rune-stave inscription; and of runes being used in love magic.

The inscription has number 257 in the Bryggen inscriptions numbering and N B257 (Norway Bryggen no. 257) in the Rundata database, and P 6 in McKinnell, Simek and Düwel's collection.

It is thought to date from the fourteenth century.

Description
The stave is four-sided, with text on each side, but one end is missing, leaving the text of each side incomplete. It is dated to ca. 1335, making it roughly contemporary to the Ribe healing-stick (ca. 1300).

Inscription

Scandinavian Runic-text Database
The Scandinavian Runic-text Database (Rundata) gives the following transliteration and normalization for the stick:

Runic transliteration
 §A rist e=k : bot:runa=r : rist : e=k biabh:runa=r : eæin:fa=l uiþ : a=luom : tuiua=lt uiþ : t=rolom : þreua=lt : uiþ : þ(u)--
 §B uiþ e=nne : skøþo : skah : ua=lkyrriu : sua:at : eæi mehi : þo:at æ uili : læuis : kona : liui : þinu g- -
 §C e=k sende=r : þer : ek se a þe=r : ylhia=r : e=rhi o=k oþola : a þe=r : rini : uþole : a=uk : i(a)luns : moþ : sittu : ald=ri : sop þu : ald=r(i) -
 §D a=nt : mer : sem : sialpre : þer : beirist : rubus : rabus : eþ : arantabus : laus : abus : rosa : ga=ua --

Old West Norse normalization
 §A Ríst ek bótrúnar, ríst ek bjargrúnar, einfalt við alfum, tvífalt við trollum, þrífalt við þurs[um],
 §B við inni skoðu skag(?) valkyrju, svát ei megi, þótt æ vili, lævís kona, lífi þínu g[randa], …
 §C ek sendi þér, ek sé á þér, ylgjar ergi ok úþola. Á þér hríni úþoli ok ioluns(?) móð. Sittu aldri, sof þú aldri …
 §D ant mér sem sjalfri þér. Beirist(?) rubus rabus et arantabus laus abus rosa gaua …

Translation

Rundata translation
Rundata provides the following translation.
 I cut runes of help; I cut runes of protection; once against the elves, twice against the trolls, thrice against the ogres …
 against the harmful 'skag'-valkyrie, so that she never shall, though she ever would-evil woman!-(injure) your life …
 I send to you, I look at you (= cast on you with the evil eye): wolfish evil and hatefulness. May unbearable distress and 'ioluns' misery take effect on you. Never shall you sit, never shall you sleep, …
 (that you) love me as yourself. [Latinate magical words] and [magical words] …

Interpretation of McKinnell, Simek, Düwel and Hall
As normalised and edited by McKinnell, Simek and Düwel, and 'somewhat tentatively' translated by Hall, the charm reads:

Theories
In the view of McKinnell, Simek and Düwel,

 it is by no means certain that the inscriptions on all four sides of this stick belong to the same charm. A and B look like part of a protective charm against demons, while C and D seem to be love-magic of the most forbidden kind. However, it remains possible that they represent two contrary aspects of the same spell – a blessing if the woman gives her love to the carver combined with a curse if she refuses it.

They point out that the addressee of side D is a woman, on account of the feminine form sjalfri.

Parallels
It has been noted that the inscription has close parallels to magic charms found in eddic poetry, especially verse 36 of the poem Skírnismál. According to Finnur Jónsson's 1932 edition of the poem and Carolyne Larrington's 2014 translation (with the line breaks adjusted to match the original):

Images
There is a photograph of a detail of the stave in Aslak Liestøl, ‘Runer frå Bryggen’, Viking: Tidsskrift for norrøn arkeologi, 27 (1964), 5–53, reproduced in Stephen A. Mitchell, ‘Anaphrodisiac Charms in the Nordic Middle Ages: Impotence, Infertility and Magic’, Norveg, 41 (1998), 19-42 (p. 29).

Gallery

References

Runic inscriptions
Bryggen inscriptions
14th-century inscriptions
Historical runic magic
Sources of Norse mythology
Eddic poetry